Volcán San Pedro (or Las Yeguas) is a  stratovolcano on the shores of Lago de Atitlán, in the Sololá Department of southern Guatemala.

At its base is the village of San Pedro La Laguna.


Notes

References

External links 
 San Pedro, Lake Atitlan video showing the view from the top.

Sololá Department
Sierra Madre de Chiapas
Stratovolcanoes of Guatemala
Subduction volcanoes
Volcano